Nicklas Heinerö (born 2 March 1991) is a Swedish professional ice hockey player. He is currently playing for Mora IK of the HockeyAllsvenskan.

He played with AIK IF in the Elitserien during the 2010–11 Elitserien season and with Djurgårdens IF Hockey during the 2014–15 SHL season.

Career statistics

Regular season and playoffs

References

External links

1991 births
AIK IF players
Djurgårdens IF Hockey players
Huddinge IK players
IK Oskarshamn players
Living people
Södertälje SK players
Swedish ice hockey left wingers
HK Dukla Trenčín players
Mora IK players
Swedish expatriate sportspeople in Slovakia
Expatriate ice hockey players in Slovakia
Swedish expatriate ice hockey people